Black Capes (Portuguese:Capas Negras) is a 1947 Portuguese musical film directed by Armando de Miranda and starring Amália Rodrigues, Alberto Ribeiro and Artur Agostinho. The film takes its name from the black capes worn by the students at the University of Coimbra. The film was an enormous success at the box office in both Portugal and Brazil, despite criticism in Coimbra that depictions of the city and its musical tradition were not accurately represented.

The film marked the debut of  Amália Rodrigues, previously known as a radio star. The film's popularity led producers to rush out another film Fado: The Story of a Singer, which was loosely based on her own life story.

Cast
 Amália Rodrigues as Maria de Lisboa  
 Alberto Ribeiro as José Duarte  
 Artur Agostinho as Manecas  
 Vasco Morgado as Jorge  
 Barroso Lopes as Coca-Bichinhos  
 Humberto Madeira as Já-Cá-Canta  
 António Sacramento as Judge  
 Graziela Mendes 
 Joaquim Miranda 
 Fernando Silva as Cunha, the pawnbroker  
 Manuela Bonito
 Alfonso Branco
 João Calazans
 Cremilda de Sousa as Dancer 
 Maria Emília Vilas 
 Antonio Gonçalves as Dancer 
 Adozinda Mariano 
 Domingo Marques 
 Regina Montenegro 
 Passos Pereira 
 Génia Silva
 Tomás de Macedo

References

Bibliography
 Creekmur, Corey K. The International Film Musical. Oxford University Press, 2012.

External links 

1947 films
1940s romantic musical films
Portuguese romantic musical films
1940s Portuguese-language films
Films directed by Armando de Miranda
Films set in Portugal
Films set in London
Films set in Madrid
Portuguese black-and-white films